2003 European Youth Olympic Festival may refer to:

2003 European Youth Summer Olympic Festival
2003 European Youth Olympic Winter Festival